Highway 8 (AR 8, Ark. 8, Hwy. 8) is an east–west state highway in Lower Arkansas. The route of  runs from Oklahoma State Highway 63 (SH-63) at the Oklahoma state line east across the state to US Route 65 (US 65) south of Eudora.

Route description
The route begins at Oklahoma State Highway 63 at the Oklahoma state line near Mena in the Ouachita National Forest and runs east. A concurrency forms with US 59/US 71 through downtown Mena, and a concurrency with Highway 88 forms after entering the city. Highway 8 breaks from these overlaps near Ward Creek and turns south to exit Mena, continuing east with minor junctions at Highway 375, Highway 980, and Highway 370 before again entering the Ouachita National Forest near the Montgomery County line. Shortly after entering Mongtomery County, Highway 8 passes the Cogburn Dipping Vat, listed on the National Register of Historic Places (NRHP), before entering Black Springs and Norman. A concurrency with Highway 27 forms in Norman, and the two routes continue south past the historic Caddo Valley Academy Complex and the Norman Town Square to exit the Ouachita National Forest and enter Pike County.

Highway 8 enters Glenwood, including junctions with Highway 8 Spur (AR 8S), US Route 70 Business (US 70B), and a brief concurrency with US 70. After turning south to leave US 70, Highway 27 follows US 70 west, ending the concurrency that began in Norman. The highway continues southeast to form a concurrency with Highway 84 which continues into Clark County. Highway 8/Highway 84 continue into Amity until Highway 84 turns north at a traffic circle near the Old Bank of Amity. Highway 8 continues east to Arkadelphia, where it meets Highway 26/Highway 51 just inside the city limits.

After Arkadelphia, the route is concurrent with AR 7 until Dalark. The route continues southeast to Fordyce and on to Warren before going straight south to Johnsville. The route continues to Eudora and south into the Grand Lake Loop, where it meets U.S. Route 65 and terminates.

Major intersections

Glenwood spur

Highway 8S (AR 8S, Ark. 8S, Hwy. 8S, and Harmon Street) is an east–west state highway spur route in Glenwood. The route of  runs from Highway 8 west to a lumberyard along the Arkansas Midland Railroad tracks.

Hamburg spur

Highway 8S (AR 8S, Ark. 8S, Hwy. 8S) is a former spur route in Hamburg. The former alignment of the parent highway existed as a spur route for six years until being renumbered as Highway 189.

History
The spur was created on November 21, 1995 along a former segment of Highway 8 during major revisions to Highway 8 to improve route continuity. The roadway was renumbered to Highway 189 at the request of the Ashley County Judge.

See also
 
 
 List of state highways in Arkansas

References

External links

008
Transportation in Ashley County, Arkansas
Transportation in Bradley County, Arkansas
Transportation in Chicot County, Arkansas
Transportation in Clark County, Arkansas
Transportation in Cleveland County, Arkansas
Transportation in Dallas County, Arkansas
Transportation in Drew County, Arkansas
Transportation in Montgomery County, Arkansas
Transportation in Pike County, Arkansas
Transportation in Polk County, Arkansas